Bedford County Training School for Negroes, also known as John McAdams High School and Harris High School for Negroes, was a high school for African-American children in Shelbyville, Tennessee and a part of Bedford Public Schools.

McAdams High, as the school was initially called, was originally until grade 10, but received grades 11 and 12 in 1923. From 1935 to 1965 Sidney W. Harris was the principal of Bedford County Training School for Negroes. Shelbyville Central High School absorbed the students in 1967, as desegregation was initiated after 1964.

References

Defunct schools in Tennessee
Public high schools in Tennessee
1967 disestablishments in Tennessee
Schools in Bedford County, Tennessee
Historically segregated African-American schools in Tennessee